A. M. Vail House was a historic home located at Middletown, New Castle County, Delaware.  It is a two-story, five-bay timber frame dwelling in the late-Federal style. It was built on a center-hall passage plan. Also on the property were a smoke house, a drive-through crib barn and granary, and a large frame cow barn.

It was listed on the National Register of Historic Places in 1985. It was demolished between 2007 and 2009.

References

External links

Houses on the National Register of Historic Places in Delaware
Federal architecture in Delaware
Houses in New Castle County, Delaware
Historic American Buildings Survey in Delaware
National Register of Historic Places in New Castle County, Delaware